Lessons is the fifth studio album by American hip hop duo Capone-N-Noreaga. The album was released on July 24, 2015, by Thugged Out Militainment and Penalty Records. The album features guest appearances from fellow American rappers Tragedy Khadafi, Royal Flush, The LOX and Raekwon. The album includes production from American record producers Ayatollah, Jahlil Beats, Large Professor, Scram Jones and Statik Selektah, among others.

Background
After disbanding for the second time in 2011, the rappers announced in 2013 that they would once again be reuniting. On May 4, 2015, the duo announced that the title of their fifth album would be Lessons. Capone-N-Noreaga also unveiled the album's cover art and tracklist. The duo also revealed that they would be partnering with Penalty Records, the label that released their 1997 debut album The War Report.

Singles
The album's first single, "3 on 3", was released on May 7, 2015.

Track listing

References

2015 albums
Capone-N-Noreaga albums
Priority Records albums
Albums produced by Ayatollah
Albums produced by Jahlil Beats
Albums produced by Large Professor
Albums produced by Scram Jones
Albums produced by Statik Selektah